Gangga (or Tingri according to name of region) is a town in Tingri County, in the south of the Tibet Autonomous Region. It has a population of around 523, and is often used as a base by mountain climbers preparing to ascend Mount Everest or Cho Oyu. It is known for its views of Mount Everest, Mount Lhotse, Mount Makalu, and Cho Oyu, which comprise four of the six highest mountains in the world.

Tingri used to be an important trading post where Sherpas from Nepal exchanged rice, grain and iron for Tibetan wool, livestock and salt. It gives its name to the more than -high broad upland basin that is known as the Tingri Plain. One must cross the pass known as the Lak Pa La (el. ) to the north to reach the Tsangpo Valley system. Shallow, fast-flowing rivers of melted snow water make its grassy meadowland ideal for grazing by Tibetan animals. The plain used to abound with gazelles, blue sheep, antelopes and khyang or wild asses but most of the animals are gone now. The Chinese army has a small base nearby.

Tingri Lankor (Ding ri glang 'khor) — Padampa's Residence was founded in 1097 CE by the South Indian Buddhist adept, Padampa Sangye (died 1117) who made five visits to Tibet and was an important person in the re-establishment of the Buddhadharma in Tibet. His consort was the Tibetan dakini Machik Labdron. The gompa or temple was built in the Padampa Sange's meditation cave and became the seat of the Dampapa School of Tibetan Buddhism. It is in the process of restoration.

Footnotes

References

External links 

Populated places in Shigatse
Paleolithic sites in China
Tingri County
Township-level divisions of Tibet
Towns in China